Aleksandre Motserelia (born 16 November 1972) is a Georgian politician. He has been a member of the Parliament of Georgia since 2020.

Biography
 State Representative to Samegrelo-Zemo Svaneti Region (2018 - 2020)
 Hazelnut Processors and Exporters Association, Chair of the Board (2013 - 2018)
 “CAP Georgia” Ltd. Managing Partner (2007 - 2018)
 Private Company, Manager/Partner; Director/partner (2005 - 2007)
 State Security Service, Operative Registration Department, Head of Subdivision (2003 - 2004)
 “Magticom” Ltd. Regional Representative (1998 - 2002)
 Customs Department, Poti Customs Department, Senior inspector (1996 - 1997)
 Customs Department, Poti Customs Department, inspector (1995 - 1996)
 Poti Sea Port, Commercial Department, Engineer (1994 - 1995)

References

External links
 Parliament of Georgia

1972 births
Living people
Members of the Parliament of Georgia